The 1989 Peace and Friendship Cup was a seven-team friendly football tournament, held in Kuwait City, Kuwait from 30 October to 12 November 1989. The timing of this tournament was a year after the end of Iran–Iraq War. Some notable sporting personalities attended this tournament such as Juan Antonio Samaranch, João Havelange and Michel Platini. The seven-teams that participated in this tournament were: Kuwait as Host, Iran Third Place Team of 1988 Asian Cup, Iraq who had Participated in 1988 Olympic Games, South Yemen, Lebanon and two countries from Africa: Uganda and Guinea.

Competition

Group stage

Group A

Group B

Semi finals

Third-place match

Final

Goalscorers 
5 goals
  Ahmed Radhi

3 goals
  Mohammed Hussein

2 goals

  Majid Namjoo-Motlagh
  Laith Hussein
  Badr Al-Anbari
  Salah Al-Hassawi
  Ronald Vvubya
  Magid Musisi

1 goals

  Abdoulaye Emmerson
  Fodé Camara
  Mojtaba Moharrami
  Shahrokh Bayani
  Mohammad Hassan Ansarifard
  Samir Kadhim
  Basil Fadhel
  Abdullah Al-Asfoor
  Hamad Al-Saleh
  Abdul Nabi
  Wael Suleyman
  Paul Hasule
  Umar Senoga

References

External links
 RSSSF Page on Peace and Friendship Cup
 TeamMelli.com
 NationalFootballTeams
 The Observer Flashback Articles
 The Observer Flashback Articles
 The Observer Flashback Articles
 The Observer Flashback Articles
 The Observer Flashback Articles
 The Observer Flashback Articles
 The Observer Flashback Articles
 The Observer Flashback Articles
 The Observer Flashback Articles
 The Observer Flashback Articles
 The Observer Flashback Articles

International association football competitions hosted by Kuwait
1989 in Asian football
1989 in African football
1989–90 in Kuwaiti football
1989–90 in Iranian football
1989–90 in Iraqi football
1989–90 in Lebanese football